Khalil Jahshan (Arabic: خليل جهشان) (born in Nazareth, British Mandate of Palestine in 1948) is a Palestinian-American political analyst and media commentator. He serves currently as Executive Director of Arab Center Washington DC, a nonprofit think tank focussing on U.S. foreign policy in the Middle East. Between 2004-2013, Jahshan was a Lecturer in International Studies and Languages at Pepperdine University and Executive Director of its Seaver College Washington DC Internship Program. He received a bachelor's degree in political science and French from Harding University in 1972.

Early life 
Jahshan was born to a Palestinian Christian family in Nazareth, British Mandate of Palestine in 1948. He completed his elementary (Ecole Jesu Adolescent-Don Bosco) and secondary education (Terra Sancta) there. In 1969, he traveled to the United States to pursue his college education at Harding University.

Titles and positions 
  Member of the boards of directors and advisory boards of various Middle East-oriented groups, including ANERA, MIFTAH and Search for Common Ground in the Middle East
 2000–2003 — Executive Vice President of the American-Arab Anti-Discrimination Committee and director of its government affairs affiliate, NAAA-ADC
 1996–2003 — Vice President of the American Committee on Jerusalem
 1990–2000 — President of the National Association of Arab-Americans

See also 
 American-Arab Anti-Discrimination Committee
 National Association of Arab-Americans
Palestinian Christians

References

External links 
Khalil Jahshan LinkedIn profile

1948 births
Living people
Palestinian academics
Harding University alumni
Pepperdine University faculty
American people of Palestinian descent
People from Nazareth
People from Washington, D.C.
Palestinian Christians